Aryan was a self-designation by Indo-Iranian people.

Aryan or Arya may also refer to:

Ethno-linguistics
 Indo-Iranians, a prehistoric people
 Indo-Aryan languages 
 Indo-Aryan peoples, people speaking the Indo-Aryan languages
 Iranian languages
 Iranian peoples, people speaking the Iranian languages
 People from the Aria region during antiquity, now Herat in western Afghanistan
 People from Ariana, the larger area that Aria was a part of, corresponding to Khorasan during the medieval period
 Inhabitants of the Sasanian Empire, the name of which in Middle Persian, Eran Shah, means Aryan Empire
 Proto-Indo-Europeans, in works published in the 19th century and early 20th century
 Aryan race (dated), a discredited racial grouping popular in the late 19th to mid-20th centuries in Europe
 Nordic race (dated), a racialist concept called "Nordicism" developed by Ariosophy and later adopted by the Nazis
 Nordic aliens or Aryan aliens
 Aryan language (disambiguation)
 Aryan languages (disambiguation)
 Aryan religion (disambiguation)

People
 Arya (name), a Persian and Indian given name (including a list of persons with the name)
 Aryan (name), a given name and surname that is popular in India and Iran
 Arya (actor) (born 1980), south Indian actor
 Arya (actress), Indian actress
 Gabriel Arya (7th century AD), Syriac writer from Arabia
 Aryan Pandit, an Indian actor and model

Organizations
 Arya Samaj, a Hindu reform movement founded by Swami Dayananda
 Aryan Brotherhood, a white supremacist street gang and organized crime syndicate in the United States
 Aryan Brotherhood of Texas
 Aryan Guard, a neo-Nazi group based in Alberta, Canada
 Aryan Nations, a white supremacist religious organization
 White Aryan Resistance, a neo-Nazi white separatist organization

Films

 The Aryan, 1915 American silent film
 Aryan (1988 film)
 Arya (2004 film), a Telugu Tollywood film starring Allu Arjun
 Aryan: Unbreakable, a 2006 Indian film
 Arya (2007 film), a Tamil film starring R. Madhavan and Bhavana
 Arya 2, a 2009 Telugu film
 Aryan (2014 film), a 2014 Kannada-language film
 Arya (TV series), 2020 Indian TV series
 Aarya (film), a 2007 Tamil-language romantic comedy film

Places
 Herat, Afghanistan, a city in Northwest Afghanistan 
 Varian, Iran, a village in Alborz Province, Iran
 Aryan, Kurdistan, a village in Kurdistan Province, Iran
 Aryan, Razavi Khorasan, a village in Razavi Khorasan Province, Iran
 Arya (urban-type settlement), Nizhny Novgorod Oblast, Russia

Other uses
 Arya (Buddhism), a concept in Buddhism
 Arya: A Philosophical Review, a monthly periodical published in India from 1914 to 1921
 Arya metre, a poetic metre used in Sanskrit and Prakrit verse
 Arya F.C., an Iranian football club
 "Arya", a 2022 song by Nigo

See also
 Ari (name) (Aryeh), an Aramaic given name used in a blessing in the Bible
 Aria (disambiguation)
 Arian (disambiguation)
 Ariane (rocket family), a series of space vehicles
 Arrian (86 A.D. – 2nd century A.D.), Greek historian
 Aryanization, in Nazism, the expulsion of "non-Aryans"
 Arya Vaisya (disambiguation), several castes
 Aryn (disambiguation)
 Ayran, a yoghurt-based drink